Elizabeth Mowins (born May 26, 1967) is an American play-by-play announcer and sports journalist for ESPN, CBS, and Marquee Sports Network. She typically calls women's college sports, and became the second woman to call nationally televised college football games for ESPN in 2005. She began doing play-by-play for NFL games in 2017 and became the first woman to call a nationally televised NFL game. In 2021, she became the first woman to call play-by-play for an NBA game on network TV.

Early life and education
Mowins was born in Syracuse, New York, having three brothers, and was a basketball, softball and soccer player at North Syracuse High School in North Syracuse, New York. She was captain of the varsity basketball team for two seasons at Lafayette College in Easton, Pennsylvania. She graduated from Lafayette with a BA in 1989, and from Syracuse University's S. I. Newhouse School of Public Communications with a master's degree in broadcast and digital journalism in 1990.

Career
Mowins began her career in 1991 as news and sports director for WXHC-FM Radio in Homer, New York, and is one of the 2009 inductees into the Greater Syracuse Sports Hall of Fame.

Mowins joined ESPN in 1994, covering college sports, including basketball, football, softball, soccer and volleyball. She has been the network's lead voice on softball coverage, including the Women's College World Series.

Mowins was paired with Cat Whitehill on ESPN's tertiary broadcast team for the telecasts of the 2011 FIFA Women's World Cup.

In 2015, Mowins became the play-by-play voice for Oakland and later Las Vegas Raiders pre-season TV broadcasts.

In May 2017, Mowins was reported by Sports Illustrateds Richard Deitsch to be the chosen play-by-play announcer on ESPN's Monday Night Football opening week late broadcast between the Los Angeles Chargers and Denver Broncos. She did that announcing job in September of that year, and thus became the first woman to call a nationally televised NFL game. That also made her only the second female play-by-play announcer in NFL regular season history; Gayle Sierens was a play-by-play announcer for a game of the NFL regular season in 1987 for NBC Sports.

Mowins also became the first female play-by-play announcer to call college basketball, the NBA, and the NFL for CBS Sports in the network's 58-year history when she called the 2017 season's Cleveland Browns–Indianapolis Colts matchup with Jay Feely. In February 2021 Mowins was named as a fill-in play-by-play announcer for Chicago Cubs games on Marquee Sports. On May 8, 2021, she became the first woman to call one of the team's regular season games.

In 2021, Mowins made her NBC Olympics debut hosting softball for the 2020 Tokyo Olympics.

Personal life
Mowins is married to Alan Arrollado, and stepmother to his son, Matt.

References

External links

Bio on Women's SportsNet
ESPNMediaZone bio
Mowins on 'Cuse Conversations Podcast in 2019

1967 births
Living people
American soccer commentators
American television sports announcers
American women's basketball players
Chicago Cubs announcers
College basketball announcers in the United States
College football announcers
Lafayette College alumni
Major League Baseball broadcasters
National Football League announcers
People from Tampa, Florida
S.I. Newhouse School of Public Communications alumni
Softball announcers
Television personalities from Syracuse, New York
Women sports announcers
Women's college basketball announcers in the United States
Women's National Basketball Association announcers
Women's United Soccer Association commentators
21st-century American women
Women sports commentators